"Here with Me" is a single from American rock band The Killers' fourth studio album, Battle Born. It was released as the third single from the album on December 16, 2012, and was written by Brandon Flowers and Fran Healy.

Critical reception
The track "Here with Me" received mixed reviews from critics. Some critics criticized the lyrics "don't want your picture on my cell phone, I want you here with me" for being too sentimental, but praised the horns-and-strings instrumental composition. Other critics praise The Killers for being able to authentically bridge the song and the album Battle Born with the rest of their music.

Chart performance
Following the single release and Cassadee Pope and The Killers' performance on The Voice, "Here with Me" peaked on several Billboard charts. Although the single did not reach the Billboard Hot 100, it peaked at number 19 on the Bubbling Under Hot 100 Chart.  The single was fairly successful in the rock charts. It peaked at number 18 on the Rock Songs chart and number 13 on the Rock Digital Singles. Furthermore, the single peaked at number 10 on the Alternative Digital Songs chart, internationally, "Here with Me" peaked at #88 on the Canadian Hot 100.

Music video
The music video to "Here with Me" was released on December 14, 2012 and was directed by acclaimed film director Tim Burton.  This marks Burton's return to directing music videos since directing the music video for The Killers' 2006 single "Bones".

Featuring actress Winona Ryder, the music video was filmed in Blackpool, England while The Killers took a break from the U.K. arena tour. Burton took the 1935 film Mad Love as inspiration for the concept of the music video. The video portrays the love story between a young man played by actor Craig Roberts and Ryder's wax mannequin. In the beginning, Roberts is seen purchasing a ticket to see Ryder's performance. Ryder is seen autographing and taking pictures with fans, while Roberts gazes at both Ryder and her wax mannequin. As the song lyrics state, "Don't want your picture on my cell phone, I want you here with me," Roberts remains desolate with just a mobile picture. Seeing the resemblance in the wax mannequin, Roberts decides to take her and embarks on several dates with her, filling the apparent emptiness he feels of not having the real Ryder beside him. The dates include trips to the beach and a slow dance at an empty performance hall, while The Killers fill the room with their sentimental anthem. At the end of the video, Roberts is seen lighting a candle wick on top of Ryder's wax mannequin and his own head.

Live performances
The Killers performed "Here with Me" in October 2012 promoting the release of their album Battle Born on Live on Letterman.

Charts

References

2012 singles
American soft rock songs
The Killers songs
Songs written by Brandon Flowers
Music videos directed by Tim Burton
Song recordings produced by Brendan O'Brien (record producer)
Songs written by Fran Healy (musician)
2012 songs
Island Records singles
Rock ballads
2010s ballads
Songs written by Dave Keuning
Songs written by Mark Stoermer
Songs written by Ronnie Vannucci Jr.